Bonsucesso Futebol Clube, usually abbreviated to Bonsucesso, is a Brazilian football team based in the city of Rio de Janeiro, in the neighbourhood of Bonsucesso. The team compete in Campeonato Carioca Série B1, the second tier of the Rio de Janeiro state football league.

History
On August 12, 1913, the club was founded. In 1924, Bonsucesso was LMDT (Liga Metropolitana de Desportos Terrestres)'s Campeonato Carioca's runner-up. The club was defeated by Vasco da Gama in the final. Leônidas da Silva, the Black Diamond, played for Bonsucesso in 1931 and in 1932, coached by Gentil Cardoso who is credited with introducing the WM formation to Brazil. In 1935, Bonsucesso's player named Emiliano Ramos, and nicknamed China was Campeonato Carioca's top scorer with 16 goals.

In 1980, the club competed in the Campeonato Brasileiro Série B, being eliminated in the second stage. In 1983, the club competed again in the Campeonato Brasileiro Série B, being eliminated in the first stage.

Club kits
Bonsucesso's first uniform was blue with red collar and white shorts. In the sixties the team adopted its current uniform with red and blue vertical stripes jerseys and white shorts.

Stadium
Bonsucesso's home stadium is Estádio da Rua Teixeira de Castro, usually known as Estádio Leônidas da Silva, which has a maximum capacity of 10,000 people.

Current squad

Rival
Bonsucesso's biggest rival is Olaria.

Achievements

 Campeonato Carioca Série A2:
 Winners (7): 1921, 1926, 1927, 1928, 1981, 1984, 2011
 Campeonato Carioca Série B1:
 Winners (1): 2003
 Copa Rio:
 Winners (1): 2019

References

External links
Bonsucesso at Arquivo de Clubes

 
Association football clubs established in 1913
Football clubs in Rio de Janeiro (state)
Football clubs in Rio de Janeiro (city)
1913 establishments in Brazil